One Fiancée at a Time (Swedish: En fästman i taget) is a 1952 Swedish comedy film directed by Schamyl Bauman and starring Sickan Carlsson, Karl-Arne Holmsten and Edvin Adolphson. It was shot at the Centrumateljéerna Studios in Stockholm. The film's sets were designed by the art director Arthur Spjuth.

Synopsis
Lillian is engaged to the engineer Arne, but feels he is quite neglectful of her. In order to stir his interest she flirts with several other men.

Cast
 Sickan Carlsson as 	Lillian 'Lillan' Carlberg
 Karl-Arne Holmsten as Arne Stockman
 Edvin Adolphson as 	Henning Werner
 Gunnar Björnstrand as 	Valentin Fredriksson-Frisk
 Stig Järrel as 	Adolf Lundkvist
 Stig Olin as Jerker Nordin
 Gull Natorp as 	Fru Stockman
 Arne Källerud as Överkonstapel i Falun
 Inger Juel as 	Clary
 John Botvid as Skomakare
 Carl-Gunnar Wingård as 	Johansson
 Olle Björklund as 	Radioröst 
 Gustaf Färingborg as 	Statspolis 
 Stig Johanson as 	Bilreparatör 
 Holger Kax as 	Polis 
 Birger Sahlberg as Olsson 
 Arne Sandberg as 	Hotellvaktmästare 
 Bengt Sundmark as 	Polis 
 Birger Åsander as Bilchaufför

References

Bibliography 
 Per Olov Qvist & Peter von Bagh. Guide to the Cinema of Sweden and Finland. Greenwood Publishing Group, 2000.

External links 
 

1952 films
1952 comedy films
Swedish comedy films
1950s Swedish-language films
Films directed by Schamyl Bauman
1950s Swedish films